Xianyueshan is a subdistrict of Liling City in Hunan Province, China. The subdistrict was renamed as the present name from Xishan on November 26, 2015. At the 2000 census, it had a population of 38,000 and an area of 38 square kilometers.

Cityscape
The township is divided into the following nine villages and four communities
Nanmen Community (南门社区)
Bishan Community (碧山社区)
Shuyuan Community (书院社区)
Caiyuanta Community (财源塔社区)
Jiangyuan Village (江源村)
Hexi Village (河西村)
Bishanling Village (碧山岭村)
Wanyi Village (万宜村)
Shimenkou Village (石门口村)
Shichengjin Village (石成金村)
Wulidun Village (五里墩村)
Dishuijing Village (滴水井村)
Fengshutang Village (枫树塘村)

Divisions of Liling